Best High School, Maninagar is an English medium primary and secondary school located at Maninagar in Ahmedabad, India.

It is recognised by the Department of Education, Gujarat State. It accepts pupils from all sections of society and prepares them for the secondary school certificate and the higher secondary school certificate examinations.

Prime Minister Narendra Modi mentioned achievements of the school and appreciated its work over the years, during his Israel visit in July 2017.

References

External links
 School website

High schools and secondary schools in Gujarat
Schools in Ahmedabad